Corey Toole is an Australian rugby union and rugby sevens player. He plays domestically with the Brumbies in the Super Rugby. From Wagga Wagga, New South Wales, Toole played for Wagga Waratahs Rugby Club and the Gungahlin Eagles before joining the Brumbies Academy. Toole has also represented the ACT Schoolboys at Nationals.

Rugby union career

Rugby sevens
Toole made his sevens debut at the first event of the 2021–22 World Rugby Sevens Series, scoring four tries including two in the Fifth place final victory against Great Britain (35–21). Since debuting for Australia at the first event in Dubai, Toole has become one of the most important players for them, racking up the most tries in the series (27) and three impact player awards (Málaga, Seville, Singapore). Following the fifth sevens event (10 April 2022), Toole held the most "Total Impact" points with 292, thirty-three points above second place Terry Kennedy (Ireland). Going into the final event of the 2021–22 series (Los Angeles), Toole remains the highest "Total Impact" points holder with 430, just fourteen points ahead of Terry Kennedy.

In March 2022 Rugby Australia (RA) announced that Toole had signed to stay with the Men's Australia sevens team until the end of the 2022 Rugby World Cup Sevens, which would see him play in both the Sevens World Cup and the 2022 Commonwealth Games, and would see him play full-time with the ACT Brumbies from 2023 Super Rugby Pacific season onwards. 

At the 2022 Commonwealth Games, Toole helped Australia to a fourth-place finish, one placing better than the previous tournament (2018). Toole scored two tries throughout the tournament. He competed for Australia at the 2022 Rugby World Cup Sevens in Cape Town.

Rugby union
In September 2022, Toole officially signed a two-year deal to the ACT Brumbies on a full-time basis. Toole made his official debut for the team in the first round of the 2023 Super Rugby Pacific season against Australian rivals New South Wales Waratahs at Sydney Football Stadium. Scoring at a crucial time in the match, and the final try for the ACT Brumbies in the game, Toole's try put the ACT Brumbies into a nine-point lead at the fifty-eighth minute mark.

Statistics
As of 24 February 2023.

Rugby sevens statistics

Super Rugby statistics

Honours
Australia

World Rugby Sevens Series
Winner: 2021–22  
World Rugby Sevens Series Impact Player
Winner: 2021–22 legs: Málaga, Seville, Singapore

References

2000 births
Living people
Australian rugby union players
Australia international rugby sevens players
Rugby union players from Wagga Wagga
Rugby sevens players at the 2022 Commonwealth Games
Rugby union wings
ACT Brumbies players